Throscodectes is a genus of Australian bush crickets.

Species
The Orthoptera Species File lists:
 Throscodectes xederoides
 Throscodectes xiphos

References 

Tettigoniidae genera
Taxonomy articles created by Polbot